Yehoshua Arieli (26 July 1916 - 3 August 2002) was an Israeli historian and Emeritus Professor of American History at the Hebrew University of Jerusalem. Arieli was perhaps best known for writing Individualism and Nationalism in American Ideology. In 1993, Arieli was awarded the Israel Prize for his contributions to history.

Education 
Between 1937 to 1940, he studied history at the Hebrew University. He attended Harvard University as a Fulbright scholar and received his PhD in 1955 from the Hebrew University.

Bibliography 

 Individualism and nationalism in American ideology (Cambridge, Massachusetts: Harvard University Press, 1964)
 Political Thought in the United States, 2 vols. (Cambridge: HUP, 1967–68)
 Totalitarian Democracy and After: Totalitarianism Movements and Political Religions, 2 vol. (Taylor & Francis, 1984)

References

External links 

 Yehoshua Arieli Archives at the National Library of Israel

1916 births
2002 deaths
People from Karlovy Vary
Czechoslovak emigrants to Mandatory Palestine
Hebrew University of Jerusalem alumni
Harvard University alumni
Academic staff of the Hebrew University of Jerusalem
Israeli historians